Following is a list of Middle Eastern restaurants:

 Aviv, Portland, Oregon, U.S.
 Bavel
 Bombay Cricket Club, Portland, Oregon
 Habibi Restaurant, Portland, Oregon
 Hoda's, Portland, Oregon
 Oleana Cambridge, Massachusetts 
 Ravagh Persian Grill
 Shalom Y'all, Portland, Oregon
 Tusk, Portland, Oregon
 Ya Hala, Portland, Oregon

Middle Eastern